Group D of the EuroBasket Women 2015 took place between 11 and 15 June 2015. The group played all of its games at MKB Aréna Sopron in Sopron, Hungary.

The group composed of Hungary, Lithuania, Slovakia, Spain and Sweden. The three best ranked teams advanced to the second round.

Standings

All times are local (UTC+2).

11 June

Sweden vs Slovakia

Lithuania vs Spain

12 June

Slovakia vs Lithuania

Hungary vs Sweden

13 June

Spain vs Slovakia

Lithuania vs Hungary

14 June

Sweden vs Lithuania

Hungary vs Spain

15 June

Spain vs Sweden

Slovakia vs Hungary

External links
Official website

Group D
2014–15 in Spanish women's basketball
2014–15 in Slovak basketball
2014–15 in Lithuanian basketball
2014–15 in Swedish basketball
2014–15 in Hungarian basketball